Into the Dark, also known as I Will Follow You into the Dark, is a 2012 American supernatural horror film written and directed by Mark Edwin Robinson. The film stars Mischa Barton and Ryan Eggold as lovers separated by supernatural elements. The project went into production in January 2012. The film's original title derives from the Death Cab for Cutie song of the same name. On 14 May 2012, Epic Pictures Group released an international trailer for the film. The film premiered at the Hollywood Film Festival on 20 October 2012, where it was nominated for the Best Feature Film award. The film was released theatrically in the United States on 11 October 2013.

Plot
Sophia Monet is a young woman battling depression after losing both her parents in the last six months. She becomes increasingly isolated and convinces herself that she'll never see her parents again, dismissing any notion of an afterlife. She is drawn out of this flux when she meets a new love interest, Adam Hunt. After Adam's mysterious disappearance, Sophia becomes determined to track him down. Her search leads to an eerie apartment building, where passing the threshold means leaving the living and entering the realm of the dead.

Cast
Mischa Barton as Sophia Monet
Ryan Eggold as Adam Hunt
Jaz Martin as Sam
Leah Pipes as Astrid
John Rubinstein as Dr. Thomas
Melinda Y. Cohen as Penny
Frank Ashmore as Mr. Carter
Jim Tooey as Officer Mason
Kris Wheeler as Officer Darby
Talon Reid as Tortured soul
Zack Tiegen as Tom
Jessee Foudray as Funeral Goer with Baby

Release
In May 2012, Screen Daily reported that Epic Pictures Group made several deals that license the film for overseas distribution. The film will be released by Tiberius Film in Germany, Eagle in the Middle East and EuroFilms for Peru, Ecuador and Bolivia.

References

External links
 
Interview with Mischa Barton

2012 films
2012 horror films
2012 horror thriller films
American independent films
American mystery thriller films
American supernatural horror films
American horror thriller films
Films set in apartment buildings
Films shot in Los Angeles
American haunted house films
Films directed by Mark Edwin Robinson
2010s English-language films
2010s American films
2012 independent films